Gianni Garghentini (born 24 April 1977 in Milan) is a former Italian football player who played as a forward. Garghentini now works as a football coach.

References

Italian footballers
S.S.D. Pro Sesto players
A.S.D. Trezzano Calcio players
Serie C players
Association football forwards
Footballers from Milan
1977 births
Living people
Serie D players
U.S. Fiorenzuola 1922 S.S. players
A.C. Meda 1913 players